Basi and Company (also known as Mr. B) was a Nigerian sitcom which ran from 1986 to 1990 on NTA, and was later syndicated across Africa. Written and produced by Ken Saro-Wiwa and filmed in Enugu, the show derived inspiration from African folklore and lampooned widespread corruption in oil-rich Nigeria while highlighting its consequences. To date, it remains one of Africa's most watched comedy programmes, with an estimated thirty million viewers during its peak.

Plot
Set in a pre-419 era, the main character Basi - popularly known as Mr. B - dreams of acquiring wealth through his hare-brained schemes, and his motto is "To be a millionaire, think like a millionaire!". Arriving in Lagos where he believes "the streets are paved with gold", he promptly moves into a dingy room owned by an equally greedy landlady simply known as Madam, a woman who believes all problems can be solved with money, hence her catchphrase "It's a matter of cash!". Despite living on her property, Basi refuses to pay his rent, infuriating Madam who unsuccessfully tries to evict him in nearly every episode. Basi infuriates her further when his dimwitted sidekick Alali moves in without her permission. The duo consistently approach Madam with their deceitful plans to extract money out of her when they are not in their room in order to dodge the rent they can hardly afford.

Dandy, a cunning man who runs a badly-maintained bar on the street, and his friend Boy Josco imitate Basi's get-rich-quick scams, but with little or no success. Segi, a beautiful but devious young lady who lives nearby, is another rival. Their fraudulent and sometimes ridiculous plans include peddling real estate on the moon, rigging the lottery, adding their names to government payrolls despite their unemployed status, persuading radio station to buy fake radio licenses, and forging WAEC results for unsuccessful candidates.

Cast

Following a dispute with creator Saro-Wiwa, Albert Egbe left the series and was replaced by stage actor Zulu Adigwe, despite not bearing a close resemblance to the original actor. The new Mr. B was re-invented as a guitar-strumming layabout who often composed songs about his get-rich-quick schemes. Four different actresses have played the part of Segi, including 700 Club Nigeria presenter Ethel Ekpe.

Among the show's more successful alumni was Mildred Iweka who had a starring role as Ada Okeke in Nigerian soap Checkmate. Zulu Adigwe was Professor Edem in the pilot episode before he was replaced by Nobert Young. In 1990, Aso Douglas appeared in a commercial for the defunct Abacus Merchant Bank, reprising her famous catchphrase ("It's a matter of cash in your interest!")

Reactions
Former Minister of Information and Culture Tony Momoh praised the use of standard English on the show, as opposed to Nigerian Pidgin which remains dominant on television and has been blamed for the poor command of standard English in the country leading to low scores in WAEC and JAMB English examinations, despite Nigeria's status as an English-speaking nation. Similarly, Roy Jibromah, a marketing manager for Saro-Wiwa's production company, claimed that "children sit glued to the television, with bad English poured down them for four hours a day, [and] they end up with substandard English". Saro-Wiwa stated in an interview in 1987: "We should go for proper English so we can relate to the rest of the world...one reason Basi is so popular is that young people are using it to learn English".

The series was also popular among women who tried to keep up with fashion trends set by the two female characters - Madam and Segi - who often wore traditional African outfits. Aso Douglas, who played Madam and acted as the show's costumer, was famed for her larger-than-life head-ties. However, Douglas told an interview that while she was grateful for the response she received from Nigerian women, she worried that they may be missing the moral lessons of the show

Merchandise and spin-offs
Following the success of Basi and Company, the original cast went on tour across Nigeria. Saro-Wiwa also published a series of books based on the series, including Basi and Company: A Modern African Folktale (1987), Mr. B Again (1989), Segi Finds the Radio (1991), and Mr. B's Mattress (1992), as well as a dramatised version of the book Mr. B: Four Television Plays. Zulu Adigwe released an album under Polygram Nigeria as Mr. B titled Mr. B Hits the Millions, and the main single became the new theme tune of the series before it was cancelled in 1990.

References

English-language television shows
Nigerian comedy television series
1986 Nigerian television series debuts
1990 Nigerian television series endings
1990s Nigerian television series
1980s Nigerian television series
Nigerian Television Authority original programming